Beinn Udlaidh (840 m) is a mountain in the Grampian Mountains, Scotland. It is located near the village of Tyndrum in Argyll and Bute.

The mountain has a plateaued summit, which has been scarred by corries on its northern side. Also on its northern side, a quartzite dyke descends from the summit ridge all the way down to Glen Orchy.

References

Mountains and hills of Argyll and Bute
Marilyns of Scotland
Corbetts